F1 in Schools is an international STEM (science, technology, engineering, mathematics) competition for school children (aged 11–19), in which groups of 3–6 students have to design and manufacture a miniature car out of the official F1 Model Block using CAD/CAM design tools.  The cars are powered by CO2 cartridges and are attached to a track by a nylon wire. They are timed from the moment they are launched to when they pass the finish line by a computer.

The cars have to follow extensive regulations, in a similar fashion to Formula 1 (e.g. the wheels of the car must be in contact with the track at all times). The cars are raced on a 20m long track with two lanes, to allow two cars to be raced simultaneously.
Software called F1 Virtual Wind Tunnel was designed specifically for the challenge, but teams can also use other computational fluid dynamics (CFD) packages such as Autodesk and AirShaper. CFD software is used to simulate the behaviour of air flowing around an object. This allows teams to compare different car designs and optimise the shape of wings to reduce drag and increase downforce which in turn can lead to a faster car.

The competition is currently operational in over 40 countries. The competition was first introduced in the UK in 1999. The competition's aim is to introduce younger people to engineering in a more fun environment. The competition is held annually, with Regional and National Finals.  The overall winners of the National Finals are invited to compete at the World Finals, which are held at a different location each year, usually held in conjunction with a Formula One Grand Prix. In the UK competition there are 3 classes of entry: Professional Class aimed at 11- to 19-year-olds; Development Class aimed at 11- to 19-year-olds in their first year; and Entry Class aimed at 11- to 14-year-olds.

, the F1 in Schools World Champions are Hydron from  Trinity Grammar School, in Australia.

The F1 in Schools World Record was set in 2016 by the Australian team Infinitude and is 0.916 seconds.

After safety issues concerning the use of extended canister chambers coupled with the Launch Energy Recovery System (LERS), the controversial device was banned globally from the 2017 World Finals season onwards, after being innovated in 2014 by Colossus F1.

Denford Ltd. unveiled a new track and timing system that debuted at the 2017 World Finals. All components are now manufactured in-house, resulting in a lower overall cost in comparison to the Pitsco produced track that it succeeds. The track's launching mechanism has had numerous reliability issues since its introduction.

In 2018, the competition's logo was updated to incorporate Formula One's updated logo. Consequently, the Bernie Ecclestone World Champions trophy was replaced, with the new World Champions trophy incorporating the new logo and the car of the 2017 World Champions, Hyperdrive.

The 2020 F1 in Schools World Finals has been postponed twice due to the effects of the COVID-19 pandemic. The World Finals 2020/21 was held as a virtual event in the UK in June 2021 with 43 competing teams.

Aspects of the competition 

Specifications judging
Specifications judging is a detailed inspection process where the race car is assessed for compliance with the F1 in Schools Technical
Regulations. Scrutineering is conducted within the confines of parc fermé where judges use a series of specially manufactured gauges and accurate measuring tools to check the car's compliance.

All of the rules and regulations season can be found at F1 in Schools website.

Engineering judging
The scheduled engineering judging interview session focuses on the application of CAD CAM analysis, CAD data organisation, orthographic drawing, 3D render and use of CNC machining. This is an informal interview where judges ask the team to demonstrate their CAD / CAM work and query teams on what they have done.

Portfolio & Pit Display Judging

Each team of students is required to produce an enterprise portfolio, engineering portfolio as well as a pit display. The portfolios are A3 size and should contain information about the team, their car design and manufacturing process, marketing techniques, project management, teamwork and team identity.
Teams are given an area to set up a pit display which is judged alongside their design portfolio by a panel of judges.

Verbal presentation judging
In advance of the competition, teams prepare a timed verbal presentation to present to a panel of judges, outlining their project. Teams usually use a PowerPoint presentation as a visual aid when presenting to the judges.
The length of the verbal presentation varies depending on the level of the competition. At World Finals Level teams are required to prepare a 10-minute presentation.

Racing

Teams race their cars against each other on the official 20-metre F1 in Schools competition track. Points are awarded for reaction time racing as well as manual launch racing.

Defining car features 
Although regulations vary from regional to national to world finals, the basic features, resembling a real F1 car, are consistent.

Front and rear wing

The cars have to include a front wing that does not cover the wheels if seen from the side or the top in the technical drawing. The front wing can not cover the wheels higher than 15mm relative to the track surface and must not be physically obstructed by any other components of the car. The minimum wingspan of the front wing is 50mm and its thickness should be between 2mm and 6mm. To allow for airflow, the front wing must have at least 5mm of clear air space to any other part of the car or track surface. 

The rear wing cannot cover the rear wheels if seen from above and must not be physically obstructed by any other component when viewed from the front. The rear wing must have a single, unbroken minimum span of 50mm and a thickness between 2mm to 6mm. Similar to the front wing, to allow for airflow the rear wing must have a minimum of 5mm clear air space to any other part of the car or track surface. 

Cartridge chamber

The cars feature a chamber to hold the CO2 cartridge. It has to be parallel to the track surface.

Wheels

The cars have to include four wheels with a given scope of width and radius that are in contact with the surface of the track at all times. The wheels must be entirely visible from the right or left side and from the top. There is a 15mm long exclusion zone behind the width of the front wheels.

Car body

The cars have to incorporate a virtual cargo horizontal to the track surface in between the centre of the axis of the wheels. This renders many "catamaran" designs insufficient. Cars have to be symmetrical to a vertically oriented reference plane. Cars also feature side boxes large enough to hold the F1 in schools decal.

F1 in Schools World Final results 
Generally, Regional/State Champions are invited to compete at their country's National Final, with the in-country organising authority inviting other teams to the National Final through the use of wildcards. The National Champions are invited to represent their country at the World Finals. The in-country organiser is permitted to invite up to 3 other teams to the World Final, one of which is generally either an in-country or international collaboration team. The winning team receives the F1 in Schools World Championship Trophy as well as scholarships for engineering degrees at UCL, the University of Huddersfield and City, University of London. The World Final podium places and Best Engineered Car are outlined below.

F1 in Schools in UK media 

F1 in Schools has been featured in UK print media and on television.

Partners 
The challenge has many supporters and sponsors which include the following:

 Airbus
 Bloodhound SSC
University College London Mechanical Engineering
 City University London
 CREST Awards
 Denford Ltd.
 Department for Business, Innovation & Skills
 Edge Foundation
 FIA Women in Motorsport Commission
 Formula Student
 Jaguar
 Unilever Williams Engineering Academy
 Silverstone Circuit
 The Institution of Engineering and Technology
 Tomorrow's Engineers

References

External links 

UK F1 in Schools Website
Re-Engineering Australia (Australian F1 in Schools Website)
German F1 in Schools Website
French F1 in Schools Website
Czech F1 in Schools Website
Irish F1 in Schools Website 
United Arab Emirates F1 in Schools Website
States of Americas F1 in Schools Website
South African F1 in Schools Website
Singapore F1 in Schools Website
Orbit Racing - F1 in Schools
ITV Article
Newsround article
BBC Article
List of awards, challenges, event and courses related to D&T
SST's article on F1 in Schools
Australian news article (on the Today Program) on F1 in Schools
Short article reporting on the F1 in Schools challenge
Short article from Newsround summarising "Atomic Jo's" F1 experience
A video on how F1 in Schools is being used to promote engineering in Australia 
F1 in Schools - Cairo American College

Formula One
Engineering education in the United Kingdom
Educational projects